Nawaphon Kaikanha (born 2 September 1991), nicknamed Wat (วัฒน์), also known as Nawaphon Nakornloung and Nawaphon Sor Rungvisai (นวพล นครหลวงโปรโมชั่น, นวพล ศ.รุ่งวิสัย), formerly Nawaphon Por Chokchai (นวพล ป.โชคชัย), is a Thai professional boxer who challenged for the WBC flyweight title in 2017.

Early life and Boxing career
He was born in a family where all family members are all boxers. His elder brother is Suriyan Sor Rungvisai, who was a WBC super flyweight world champion between 2011–12. He started from Muay Thai by his father is a supporter since while studying at year 2.

Nawaphon made his professional boxing debut in late 2010 at Sisaket Rajabhat University, Sisaket province when he wins Palangpol Chaiyonggym a Thai boxer. He made a record 36 wins by won ABCO or WBC Asia flyweight title in 2011 too. Before challenge vacant WBC flyweight title with Juan "Churritos" Hernández a Mexican contender at Nimibutr Stadium in the National Stadium on March 4, 2017 as he is ranked #1 in this weight.

This fight is also the first of a professional boxing match in Thailand nearly 30 years, with world-class standards (Boxing events in Thailand are often held on an open-air temporary ring in the midst of sunny afternoon, which is open to onlookers for free. Because the expenses are sponsored by companies or local politicians. That makes it look more like a local fair than a world-class contest.) such as there are ticket sales for visitors, organized in indoor arena with air conditioner and start the event in the prime time of weekend (Saturday night) promoted by BEC-TERO Entertainment and Nakornloung Promotion. But the results, it appears that he was defeated by TKO (referee stops contest) in the late third round.

On April 21, 2018 he overcome senior fellow-countryman Amnat Ruenroeng, who was former IBF flyweight world champion, by TKO in the fifth round at Workpoint Studio, Pathum Thani.

Professional boxing record

References

External links
 

Living people
1991 births
Flyweight boxers
Nawaphon Kaikanha
Nawaphon Kaikanha